I Love You is the tenth EP from Said the Whale.  The album was produced by Tom Dobrzanski and was released on June 4, 2013 on Hidden Pony Records.  "I Love You", the first single from the album peaked at No. 3 on the Mediabase Alternative Rock chart.

Critical reception
The album is described by The Owl Mag as being "centered on the joys and tribulations of family" while NOW Magazine portrays the album as "flirty but so G-rated that even the best lyrics are dulled by all the saccharine sweetness".

Said the Ale beer 
Concurrent with the release of the EP, Townsite Brewing in Powell River, British Columbia released a beer named after the band called Said the Ale.

Track listing 
 "I Love You" - 2:47
 "Narrows" - 3:29
 "Mother" - 3:12 
 "Barbara-Ann"

Singles

Title track video 
The lyric video for the title track "I Love You" portrays a doll with a hula skirt bouncing on the dashboard of a car driving down various types of roads.

References 

2013 EPs
Said the Whale albums